Argentina first played against Italy in 1978 in Rovigo, with Italy running out 19-6 winners. They next met in the Rugby World Cup in 1987, Argentina coming out on top 25-16. Since then, Argentina have had the better record.

Summary

Overall

Records
Note: Date shown in brackets indicates when the record was or last set.

Results

List of series

References

Argentina national rugby union team matches
Italy national rugby union team matches
Argentina–Italy relations
Rugby union rivalries in Italy